The Toronto Film Critics Association Award for Best Animated Film is one of the annual awards given by the Toronto Film Critics Association.

Winners

2000s

2010s

2020s

Multiple wins
Wes Anderson - 2
Chris Butler - 2
Andrew Stanton - 2

References

External links
 Toronto Film Critics Association - Past Award Winners

Awards for best animated feature film
Awards established in 2003